Elizabeth is a census-designated place and unincorporated community located in Washington County, Mississippi.

It was first named as a CDP in the 2020 Census which listed a population of 127.

Demographics

2020 census

Note: the US Census treats Hispanic/Latino as an ethnic category. This table excludes Latinos from the racial categories and assigns them to a separate category. Hispanics/Latinos can be of any race.

References

Gallery 

Unincorporated communities in Washington County, Mississippi
Census-designated places in Washington County, Mississippi
Unincorporated communities in Mississippi